Elpoca Mountain is a  mountain summit located at the southern end of the Opal Range in the Canadian Rockies of Alberta, Canada. Its nearest higher peak is Mount Evan-Thomas,  to the north. Elpoca Mountain is situated 4.0 kilometres south of Mount Jerram, and 2.0 km east of Gap Mountain, and all are within Peter Lougheed Provincial Park.

History
"Elpoca" is a portmanteau of nearby Elbow River and Pocaterra Creek.

The mountain's name was officially adopted in 1928 by the Geographical Names Board of Canada.

The first ascent of the peak was made in 1960 by G. D. Elliot, H, Kirby, and P.S. Scribens.

Geology
Elpoca Mountain is composed of sedimentary rock laid down during the Precambrian to Jurassic periods. Formed in shallow seas, this sedimentary rock was pushed east and over the top of younger rock during the Laramide orogeny. Elpoca Mountain was created during the Lewis Overthrust. The steeply tilted strata are virtually the same in each peak of the Opal Range, with softer layers sandwiched between harder layers.

Climate
Based on the Köppen climate classification, Elpoca Mountain is located in a subarctic climate with cold, snowy winters, and mild summers.

In terms of favorable weather, June through September are the best months to climb Elpoca Mountain.

Precipitation runoff from the west side of the mountain drains into tributaries of the Kananaskis River, whereas the east side drains into Elbow River.

See also
 Geology of the Rocky Mountains
 List of mountains in the Canadian Rockies

References

External links
 Elpoca Mountain weather: Mountain Forecast

Three-thousanders of Alberta
Alberta's Rockies